Freienbach SOB railway station is a railway station in the Swiss canton of Schwyz and municipality of Freienbach. The station is located on the Pfäffikon SZ–Arth-Goldau railway line, owned by the Südostbahn (SOB). It is an intermediate stop on Zurich S-Bahn service S40, from Einsiedeln to Rapperswil.

Freienbach SOB station should not be confused with the nearby Freienbach SBB railway station, which is on the Lake Zurich left-bank railway line.

References 

Freienbach SOB
Freienbach SOB
Freienbach